The Terrapin (officially 4-ton amphibian) was a British-manufactured amphibious transport vehicle of the Second World War. It was first used in 1944 at Antwerp during the Battle of the Scheldt.

Terrapins served with the Royal Engineer assault teams of the 79th Armoured Division and were used to carry infantry units (Canadian and British) over rivers.

Development
Due to a shortage of US-manufactured DUKWs, the British Ministry of Supply commissioned Thornycroft to design an amphibious vehicle capable of ferrying supplies and troops from ship to shore for the D-Day landings. Some 500 Terrapin Mark 1 were built by Morris Commercial, the vehicle side of Morris Motors Limited. A Mark 2 Terrapin with a number of improvements reached the prototype stage, but the war ended before it entered production.

Mark 1
The Terrapin was powered by two Ford V8 engines mounted side by side, with each motor driving the wheels on one side. Wheel braking was used to steer, the brakes being operated by levers. On a level surface, the vehicle was supported on the four middle wheels, the front and rear wheels remaining clear of the surface (the front pair being raised significantly, the rear pair only slightly). The front and rear wheels provided support and traction on soft surfaces and when climbing slopes, such as riverbanks. When driven in the water, it was propelled by two rear-mounted propellers.

Despite success in its first military action, the Terrapin was not overall a successful design and had many significant defects, which were never overcome in service. Due to the large diameter tyres, the Terrapin was a relatively high vehicle and, although open-topped, it was difficult to enter and exit. Any soldier attempting to exit over the side faced both prolonged exposure to enemy fire and possible injury from the fall. Like the Medium Mark A Whippet tank of the First World War, the Terrapin had engines for each side of the vehicle with skid steering. This arrangement was awkward on the Whippet, and on the Terrapin as well. If one engine broke down, the Terrapin tended to swing around violently.

The two centrally located engines split the cargo compartment in two and, though rated as a 4-ton vehicle, this prevented large loads, such as heavy artillery or vehicles, from being carried. In addition, the driver had poor visibility as he was centrally located inside the middle of the vehicle. This was compounded by the installation of a canvas cover over the forward hold. As a result, another crew member typically had to stand behind the driver and provide directions. In use, the vehicle was found to be rather slow, and was easily swamped in rough seas. These failings quickly led to the abandonment of the design in favour of the development of the Mark 2, but the growing availability of large numbers of the much more successful DUKW made further development unnecessary.

Mark II
This was similar to the Mark 1, but had a forward driving position.

Use
During the operations against Walcheren, Terrapins and Buffalo transports carried the 9th Canadian Infantry Brigade in what was intended to be a diversionary attack across a mile wide inlet on 9 October 1944. A sufficiently large bridgehead was made that the attack became the main attempt and the German defences were turned.

Terrapins were used in Operation Vitality II on 26 October 1944 to carry units from the British 52nd (Lowland) Division across the Scheldt; Amphibious Sherman DD tanks led the attack.

After the war, Terrapins, together with DUKWs, were used as a form of public transport on the Inundation of Walcheren until circa 1946.

See also
 DUKW
 Su-Ki
 Landing Vehicle Tracked, known as (Water) Buffalo in British service.
 Alvis Stalwart
 Argo (ATV manufacturer)

Notes

References

External links

 The Clearing of the Scheldt Estuary and the Liberation of Walcheren, UK Veterans Agency
 Imperial War Museum: THE AMPHIBIOUS JEEP, AQUACHEETAH, DUKW, TERRAPIN (PART 1) 1943 movie showing various amphibious vehicles (including the Terrapin) under test; Imperial War Museum Collections
 World War II 60th Anniversary: The Clearing of the Scheldt Estuary and the Liberation of Walcheren 2 October – 7 November 1944
  Veicolo anfibio Terrapin

Military trucks of the United Kingdom
Wheeled amphibious vehicles
Thornycroft military vehicles
Amphibious vehicles of World War II
Amphibious military vehicles
Military vehicles introduced from 1940 to 1944